Richard Eugene Lyons (June 19, 1920 – January 29, 2000) was an American poet, and Professor of English at North Dakota State University from 1950 to 1982.

Life
He joined with the newly organized North Dakota Institute for Regional Studies in its investigation of the culture, history, and heritage of North Dakota.

His poems have appeared in the Quarterly Review of Literature, The Kenyon Review, The New Yorker, The Paris Review, and The Nation. He was also a graphic artist who had paintings and prints in regional and national exhibitions.

His papers are held at North Dakota State University.

Works

 Men and Tin Kettles, A. Swallow, 1956
 One Squeaking Straw (1958)
 Paintings in Taxicabs (1965)
 Above Time (1968)

Editor
 Poetry North: Five Poets of North Dakota (1970)
 
 Invisible poems, Merrykit Press, 1976
 Scanning the Land: Poems in North Dakota. Fargo: North Dakota Institute for Regional Studies, 1980,

References

American editors
Writers from Detroit
1920 births
2000 deaths
North Dakota State University faculty
20th-century American poets